NatWest Holdings is an intermediate holding company for the NatWest Group's retail banking interests in the United Kingdom. 

It was established in 2016, as part of a structural reform intended to comply with the requirements of the Financial Services (Banking Reform) Act 2013. The Act implements the Independent Commission on Banking recommendation that core domestic operations should be "ring-fenced" from wholesale and investment banking activities by 2019.

Operations
Registered in England, NatWest Holdings was formed to be the direct parent of five licensed banks:

Coutts & Co. is a wholly owned subsidiary of NatWest. NatWest Holdings includes the Lombard North Central asset finance business and RBS Invoice Finance (Holdings).

As authorised brands of Royal Bank of Scotland, the ring-fenced group also covers Messrs. Drummond and Holt's Military Banking, the only remaining branches of RBS operating in England and Wales. Adam & Company and Child & Co. closed in 2022.

Two other licensed banks within the NatWest Group – NatWest Markets (created at the same time) and Royal Bank of Scotland International (incorporating NatWest International, Coutts Crown Dependencies and Isle of Man Bank) – sit outside the ring-fence. RBS International, NatWest Trustee and Depositary Services, RBS International Funds Services S.A. and Coutts & Co. (Cayman) are wholly owned subsidiaries of The Royal Bank of Scotland International (Holdings).

On 19 February 2021, NatWest Group announced a phased withdrawal of all banking activity and associated services within the Republic of Ireland. On 3 May 2021, the business of Ulster Bank in Northern Ireland was transferred to its parent company, NatWest, as part of a court-approved Banking Business Transfer Scheme.

References

External links

 NatWest Group

Banks of the United Kingdom
NatWest Group
Financial services companies based in the City of London
Banks established in 2016
British companies established in 2016